Edgeworth may refer to:

People
 Edgeworth (surname)

Places
 Edgeworth, Gloucestershire, England
 Edgeworth, New South Wales, Australia
 Edgeworth, Pennsylvania, USA
 Edgeworth Island, Nunavut, Canada
 Edgeworthstown, County Longford, Republic of Ireland

Other uses
 Edgeworth conjecture on the relation of the core and the Walrasian equilibria
 Edgeworth series of higher-order asymptotic expansions for probability densities.

See also

 
 
 Edgworth, a village in Lancashire, England